John Garnier may refer to:

 John Garnier (Royal Navy officer) (born 1934), Royal Navy officer and courtier
 John Carpenter Garnier (1839–1926), English politician
 John Garnier (cricketer) (1813–1838), English cricketer and clergyman